This is a list of Indian trade unions in tea gardens, with their political affiliation in parentheses.

Assam 
 Assam Chah Mazdoor Sangha, affiliated to Indian National Trade Union Congress (Indian National Congress)
 Assam Sangrami Chah Shramik Sangh, affiliated to All India Central Council of Trade Unions (Communist Party of India (Marxist-Leninist) Liberation)
 Assam Tea Labour Union
 Cachar Chah Sramik Union, affiliated to Indian National Trade Union Congress (Indian National Congress)
 Namoni Asam Cha Mazdoor Sangh, affiliated to Centre of Indian Trade Unions (Communist Party of India (Marxist))

West Bengal 
 All West Bengal Tea Garden Labourers Union (Communist Party of India (Marxist-Leninist))
 Cha Bagan Mazdoor Union, affiliated to Centre of Indian Trade Unions (Communist Party of India (Marxist))
 Darjeeling District Chia Kaman Majdoor Union, affiliated to Centre of Indian Trade Unions (Communist Party of India (Marxist))
 Darjeeling District Chia Kaman Majdoor Union, affiliated to All India Trade Union Congress (Communist Party of India)
 Darjeeling Terai Dooars Cheeya Kaman Mazdoor Union (Communist Party of Revolutionary Marxists)
 Darjeeling Terai Dooars Plantation Labour Union affiliated to (Gorkha Jan Mukti Morcha)
 Dooars Cha Bagan Workers’ Union, affialied to United Trade Union Congress (Revolutionary Socialist Party)
 Himalayan Plantation Workers’ Union (Gorkha National Liberation Front)
 National Union of Plantation Workers, affiliated to Indian National Trade Union Congress (Indian National Congress)
Terai Sangrami Cha Sramik Union affiliated to the All India Central Council of Trade Unions (Communist Party of India (Marxist-Leninist) Liberation)
 West Bengal Cha Mazdoor Sabha, affiliated to Hind Mazdoor Sabha

References

Labour movement in India
Trade unions in India
Tea industry in India
India
Trade unions